The Our Lady of Penha Chapel is a church in Penha Hill, São Lourenço, Macau, China.

History

The land where the church stands was donated by the Senate of the Augustinians for the construction of the church, which was dedicated to the Our Lady of Penha of France. The church was then constructed in 1622 and became the property of the Augustinians until 1834 when they were expelled from Macau. In 1837, the church was reconstructed along with the Bishop residence next to it. In 1935, it was then again completely rebuilt.

Architecture
At the front courtyard of the church stands the Our Lady of Lourdes statue. At the steps of the hillside staircase exists the picturesque grotto of Our Lady of Lourdes.

See also
 List of tourist attractions in Macau
 Christianity in Macau

References

External links

 Chapel of Our Lady of Penha – Macao Government Tourism Office website

Roman Catholic churches in Macau
1622 establishments in China
1622 establishments in the Portuguese Empire
17th-century establishments in Macau
Macau Peninsula
Roman Catholic chapels in China